Aleksander Tõnisson VR I/1 (17 April 1875 – 30 June 1941) was an Estonian military commander (Major General) during the Estonian War of Independence.

In 1899 he graduated from Vilnius Military Academy. Tõnisson participated in Russo-Japanese war and in World War I. In 1917 he participated in formation of Estonian national units and as commander of 1st Estonian regiment participated in battles at Riga front. In 1918 he escaped from German occupation to Finland, returned in autumn and became commander of 1st Division of Estonia. During Estonian Liberation War Tõnisson fought successfully at Viru Front. After war he served twice as minister of defence, in 1934 he retired from military and was mayor of Tartu 1934–1939 and Lord Mayor (ülemlinnapea) of Tallinn 1939–1940. In 1940 Soviet occupation authorities arrested Tõnisson and executed him the following year.

Honours and awards
 Order of St. Vladimir, 4th class; for distinguished service
 Cross of Liberty, first-class, first degree.
 Commander of the Order of the Cross of the Eagle
 Protection of Natural Amenities Medal, 2nd Rank

References
Ülo Kaevats et al. 2000. Eesti entsüklopeedia 14. Tallinn: Eesti Entsüklopeediakirjastus, 

1875 births
1941 deaths
People from Jõgeva Parish
People from Kreis Dorpat
Patriotic League (Estonia) politicians
Defence Ministers of Estonia
Members of the Estonian National Assembly
Members of the Riiginõukogu
Mayors of Tartu
Mayors of Tallinn
Estonian major generals
Imperial Russian Army officers
Russian military personnel of the Russo-Japanese War
Russian military personnel of World War I
Estonian military personnel of the Estonian War of Independence
Recipients of the Order of St. Vladimir, 4th class
Recipients of the Order of St. Anna, 2nd class
Recipients of the Order of St. Anna, 3rd class
Recipients of the Order of St. Anna, 4th class
Recipients of the Order of Saint Stanislaus (Russian), 2nd class
Recipients of the Order of Saint Stanislaus (Russian), 3rd class
Recipients of the Cross of Liberty (Estonia)
Recipients of the Military Order of the Cross of the Eagle, Class I
Recipients of the Military Order of the Cross of the Eagle, Class III
Recipients of the Protection of Natural Amenities Medal, Rank II
Estonian people executed by the Soviet Union